The Diwan Mosque (also spelled Diouane Mosque) is a mosque in Fes, Morocco. It was founded by the Alaouite sultan Moulay Slimane during his reign between 1792 and 1822. It is located in the center of Fes el-Bali (the old city), on Diwan Street (Rue Diwan), just north of Tala'a Kebira near its eastern end. It is one of the neighbourhood Friday mosques of the city.

See also
  Lists of mosques 
  List of mosques in Africa
  List of mosques in Morocco

References 

Mosques in Fez, Morocco
'Alawi architecture